Vardenut is a village in the Aparan Municipality of the Aragatsotn Province of Armenia.

References 

Populated places in Aragatsotn Province

Populated places established in 1829